Spanish heath may refer to two species of plants within the genus Erica:

Erica australis
Erica lusitanica

See also 
 Coenonympha, a butterfly